The One and Only is the eighteenth studio album recorded by the American R&B group Gladys Knight & the Pips, released in August 1978 on the Buddah label. It was their eighth and final album recorded for Buddah.

The first single, "Sorry Doesn't Always Make It Right", was released in late 1977 and peaked at #24 on the R&B singles chart. Three more singles were released, including the title song, "The One and Only", "Come Back and Finish What You Started" and "It's a Better Than Good Time". They only achieved moderate success on the charts, with "It's a Better Than Good Time" reaching #16 on the R&B chart and "Come Back and Finish What You Started" peaking at #15 on the UK Singles Chart. None of the singles made the Billboard Hot 100.

Track listing

Charts

Singles

References

External links
The One and Only at Discogs

Gladys Knight & the Pips albums
1978 albums
Albums produced by Michael Masser
Buddah Records albums